George Washington Crouse (November 23, 1832 – January 5, 1912) was a U.S. Representative from Ohio.

Born in Tallmadge, Ohio, Crouse attended the common schools.
He taught school for five years.
He moved to Akron, Ohio.
Deputy in offices of county auditor and treasurer 1855–1858.
Auditor of Summit County from 1858 to 1863, he then served as county treasurer in 1863.
Manager in 1863 of the Akron branch of C. Aultman & Co. Buckeye mower and reaper business
Upon the organization of Aultman, Miller & Co. in 1865, as a separate corporation, Crouse became secretary and treasurer, and later its president.
During the Civil War Crouse served as sergeant in Company F, 164th Ohio Infantry, and served in fortifications around Washington in 1864.
He served as member and president of the city council for four years and of the board of education of the city of Akron four years.
He was commissioner of Summit County in 1874 and 1875 and served as a member of the State senate from 1885 to 1887.

Crouse was elected as a Republican to the Fiftieth Congress (March 4, 1887 – March 3, 1889) but declined to be a candidate for renomination in 1888, resuming former business activities.
His daughter, Mary, married David Marshall Mason from Scotland who was a Member of Parliament at Westminster.
He died in Akron, Ohio, January 5, 1912 and was interred in Glendale Cemetery.

Crouse married Martha K. Parsons of Kent, Ohio on October 18, 1859. Their children were Martha P., Julia M., Mary R., Nellie J., and George W., Jr.

References

External links

1832 births
1912 deaths
County auditors in the United States
People from Tallmadge, Ohio
Republican Party Ohio state senators
People of Ohio in the American Civil War
Union Army soldiers
19th-century American politicians
Burials at Glendale Cemetery, Akron
Republican Party members of the United States House of Representatives from Ohio
19th-century American businesspeople